Ornithomya are genus of biting flies in the family of louse flies, Hippoboscidae. There are 29 known species. All species are parasites of birds.

Distribution
Ornithomya are found worldwide with the exception of Antarctica, however the largest number of species are found in South East Asia and Africa.

Systematics
Genus Ornithomya Latreille, 1802
Species group 'a'
Ornithomya alpicola Maa, 1975
Ornithomya anchineuria Speiser, 1905
Ornithomya apelta Maa, 1969
Ornithomya avicularia (Linnaeus, 1758)
Ornithomya bequaerti Maa, 1969
Ornithomya candida Maa, 1967
Ornithomya chloropus Bergroth, 1901
Ornithomya fringillina Curtis, 1836
Ornithomya fuscipennis Bigot, 1885
Ornithomya gigantea Bear & Friedberg, 1995
Ornithomya marginalis Maa, 1964
Ornithomya medinalis Maa, 1975
Ornithomya opposita Walker, 1849
Ornithomya papillosa Maa, 1964
Ornithomya parva Macquart, 1843
Species group 'b'
Ornithomya biloba Dufour, 1827
Ornithomya cecropis Hutson, 1971
Ornithomya comosa Kolenati, 1930
Ornithomya fur Schiner, 1868
Ornithomya inocellata Ferris, 1930
Ornithomya roubaudi Séguy, 1938
Species group 'c'
Ornithomya ambigua Lutz, 1915
Ornithomya hoffmannae Bequaert, 1954
Species group 'd'
Ornithomya rottensis (Statz, 1940) (fossil)
Incertae sedis
Ornithomya areolata Maa, 1986
Ornithomya clarki Paramonov, 1969
Ornithomya greeni Maa, 1986
Ornithomya rupes Hutson, 1981
Ornithomya sorbens Hutson, 1971

References

Parasites of birds
Hippoboscidae
Taxa named by Pierre André Latreille
Hippoboscoidea genera